Chlamydia research is the systematic study of the organisms in the taxonomic group of bacteria Chlamydiota (formerly Chlamydiae), the diagnostic procedures to treat infections, the disease chlamydia, infections caused by the organisms, the epidemiology of infection and the development of vaccines. The process of research can include the participation of many researchers who work in collaboration from separate organizations, governmental entities and universities.

Funding
The Centers for Disease Control and Prevention (CDC) offers funding to research the biology, physiology, epidemiology, vaccine development, and publish systematic reviews of Chlamydia species.  Other funding sources include the National Chlamydia Coalition.

Institutes

NIAID 
The National Institute of Allergy and Infectious Diseases (NIAID) conducts research at the Rocky Mountain Laboratories in Hamilton, Montana. This facility is developing a vaccine to prevent Chlamydia trachomatis infection. The vaccine being tested is a single-component vaccine that is designed to protect against all 15 chlamydia varieties. Studies have already shown that the vaccine can prevent laboratory cells from becoming infected.

Another prevention strategy being pursued is the development of topical microbicides (preparations that can be inserted into the vagina to prevent infection) that are effective and easy for women to use.

Studies continue to determine the organism's genetic makeup. NIAID-supported scientists have determined the complete genome (genetic blueprint) for C. trachomatis.

Max Planck Institute for Infection Biology 
The Max Planck Institute for Infection Biology continues its research into chlamydia infection. The institute has published over 140 studies related to chlamydia.

Queensland University of Technology 
There are research projects in several areas at the Queensland University of Technology, including development of a human vaccine for chlamydial sexually transmitted disease and understanding basic mechanisms of regulation, including the importance of chlamydial proteases. Chlamydia infections in wildlife are part of the research into chlamydia, particularly koalas' genomics and gene regulation studies in chlamydia.

A sample list of primary publications:
10.1111/j.1574-695X.2011.00843.x
10.1186/1471-2334-6-152

University of Southampton 
Vaccine development at the University of Southampton continues.

Vaccine
Vaccine research is ongoing in independent and institutional settings.

Clinical studies
A clinical study involves research using human volunteers (also called participants) that is intended to add to medical knowledge. There are two main types of clinical studies: clinical trials (also called interventional studies) and observational studies.

Clinical trials
Clinical trials are used by researchers investigating the efficacy of interventions or protocol in the epidemiology, detection, prevention and treatment of chlamydia infections. Interventions are the use of medical products, medication, devices, procedures or changes in the participants' behavior. The effects on the participants are measured and compared to previous trials, placebo or a new medical approach, or to no intervention. The National Institutes of Health support ongoing research in the study of chlamydia infection. At least 113 studies have been initiated as of 2015. One example was the clinical trial of eye prophylaxis in newborns in the prevention of neonatal conjunctivitis caused by Chlamydia trachomatis.

Observational studies
Research related to chlamydia can take the form of an observational study. This type of study assesses outcomes in groups of participants according to a research plan or protocol. The volunteers in the study may receive interventions such as medical products, medications, devices, or procedures as part of their routine medical care. The volunteers in this type of study are not assigned to specific interventions as in a clinical trial. An example of an observational study regarding chlamydia infection was "Non-Invasive Sexually Transmitted Disease (STD) Testing in Women Seeking Emergency Contraception or Urine Pregnancy Testing: Meeting the Needs of an At-Risk Population" in 2010. Observational studies employ the use of randomised control studies.

Case studies
A case study that researches the prevalence and prevention of chlamydia can be many things. It often entails personal contact and a detailed history of the participants along with an extensive physical examination. Included in case studies of chlamydia infection and the case results include its related contextual conditions. Chlamydia case studies also can be produced by following a formal research method. These case studies are likely to appear in formal research venues, such as journals, professional conferences and administrative science.

In doing case study research, the case being studied may be an individual, organization, event, or action, existing in a specific time and place. For instance, clinical science has produced both well-known case studies of individuals and also case studies of clinical practices.

Evidence-based research
Evidence-based medicine chlamydia studies optimizes decision-making by employing the use of information based upon well-designed research. This approach to the study of chlamydia requires that only research conducted coming from meta-analyses, systematic reviews, and randomized controlled trials) can yield widely applied recommendations. Some examples of evidence-based research on chlamydia include:

 Chlamydia trachomatis and Genital Mycoplasmas: Pathogens with an Impact on Human Reproductive Health. Ljubin-Sternak S, Meštrović T. Journal Pathog. 2014;2014:183167. doi: 10.1155/2014/183167. Epub 2014 Dec 31.
 Screening for Gonorrhea and Chlamydia: Systematic Review to Update the U.S. Preventive Services Task Force Recommendations [Internet]. Nelson HD, Zakher B, Cantor A, Deagas M, Pappas M.Rockville (MD): Agency for Healthcare Research and Quality (US); 2014 Sep.

References

 Using Wikipedia for Research

External links

Case studies from the National Chlamydia Coalition 

 Jackson County Health Department
 SUNY/Buffalo
 Michigan Department of Community Health
 Old Dominion University
 Maryland Department of Juvenile Services
 Minnesota Department of Health

Sexually transmitted diseases and infections
Bacterial diseases
Chlamydia infections
Infections with a predominantly sexual mode of transmission
Chlamydiota
Medical research